Rajab is a village in Jalandhar district in the Indian state of Punjab.

About 

Post code 
Rajab's Post office is Mustafapur.

References 

  Official website of Punjab Govt. with Rajab's details

Villages in Jalandhar district